Schloss Mariakirchen is a water castle in Hofmarkt Mariakirchen, Arnstorf, Landkreis Rottal-Inn, Bavaria, Germany. It was built in 1550 by Georg von Closen and Barbara von Notthafft.

The castle is a registered historic building and is now mostly used as a venue for events.

About 100 yards away, a hotel building (Schlossparkhotel Mariakirchen) was erected in 2007. A Bavarian restaurant with beergarden is situated In front of the entrance.

See also
 List of castles in Bavaria

Literature 
 Ilse Louis: Pfarrkirchen. Die Pfleggerichte Reichenberg und Julbach und die Herrschaft Ering-Frauenstein. (= Historischer Atlas von Bayern, Teil Altbayern, Heft 31). Verlag Michael Laßleben, München, 1973 (S. 273–278). .

References

External links 
 

Mariakirchen
Water castles in Germany
Buildings and structures completed in 1550
Rottal-Inn
Registered historic buildings and monuments in Bavaria